Alexandru Curtianu (born 11 February 1974) is a Moldovan professional football coach and a former player. He is the manager of Russian club Yadro St. Petersburg.

Club career
He made his professional debut in the Soviet First League in 1991 for Zimbru Chişinău.

International goals
Scores and results list Moldova's goal tally first.

Managerial statistics

Honours
	Zimbru Chișinău
 Moldovan National Division: 1992, 1993, 1994, 1995, 1996; runner-up: 1997, 2001

Widzew Łódź
 Ekstraklasa: 1997

Zenit Saint Petersburg
 Russian Cup: 1999

References

External links
 
 

1974 births
Living people
Soviet footballers
Moldovan footballers
Moldova international footballers
Moldovan expatriate footballers
Ekstraklasa players
Bundesliga players
Russian Premier League players
Moldovan Super Liga players
FC Zimbru Chișinău players
Widzew Łódź players
FC Zenit Saint Petersburg players
Hamburger SV players
FC Moscow players
Expatriate footballers in Poland
Moldovan expatriate sportspeople in Poland
Expatriate footballers in Germany
Moldovan expatriate sportspeople in Germany
Expatriate footballers in Russia
Moldovan expatriate sportspeople in Russia
Association football midfielders
Moldovan football managers
FC Zimbru Chișinău managers
FK Jelgava managers
FC Dynamo Saint Petersburg managers
Moldova national football team managers
Moldovan Super Liga managers
Moldovan expatriate football managers
Expatriate football managers in Latvia
Moldovan expatriate sportspeople in Latvia
Expatriate football managers in Lithuania
Moldovan expatriate sportspeople in Lithuania